Bent Krog (31 March 1935 – 13 August 2004) was a Danish footballer. He played in five matches for the Denmark national football team in 1961. He was also part of Denmark's squad at the 1960 Summer Olympics, but he did not play in any matches.

References

External links
 

1935 births
2004 deaths
Danish men's footballers
Denmark international footballers
Footballers from Copenhagen
Association football midfielders
Kjøbenhavns Boldklub players